James D. Feeter (June 28, 1840 – March 20, 1903) was an American banker and politician from New York.

Life
He was born on June 28, 1840, in Little Falls, Herkimer County, New York, the son of Assemblyman James Feeter (1806–1892) and Cynthia (Small) Feeter (died 1878). He attended the common schools and then engaged in the grocery business with his father. In 1880, he began to work for the Little Falls National Bank, first as Assistant Cashier, then as Cashier, and finally became President of the bank. In 1881, he married Ella Craig.

He was at times Collector, and Treasurer, of the Village of Little Falls; and a delegate to the 1876 Republican National Convention.

Feeter was a member of the New York State Senate (33rd D.) from 1899 to 1902, sitting in the 122nd, 123rd, 124th and 125th New York State Legislatures.

He died suddenly on March 20, 1903, at his home in Little Falls, New York, of "heart disease"; and was buried at the Church Street Cemetery there.

Sources

External links
 

1840 births
1903 deaths
Republican Party New York (state) state senators
People from Little Falls, New York
American bankers
19th-century American politicians
19th-century American businesspeople